Bodibe may refer to:

 Tumelo Bodibe, cricketer
Bodibe, South Africa, town